Freedom Township is a township in Bourbon County, Kansas, USA.  As of the 2000 census, its population was 505.

Geography
According to the USGS, it contains three cemeteries: Avondale, Glendale and Zion.

The Little Osage River and smaller streams of Clever Creek, East Laberdie Creek, Elk Creek, Elm Creek, Laberdie Creek, Lost Creek and West Laberdie Creek run through this township.

Further reading

References

 USGS Geographic Names Information System (GNIS)

External links
 City-Data.com
 Bourbon County Maps: Current, Historic Collection

Townships in Bourbon County, Kansas
Townships in Kansas